Neopotamia armatana is a moth of the family Tortricidae. It is found in Vietnam.

References

Moths described in 1988
Olethreutini